Duncan McMeekin (born 2 January 1955) is an independent Australian mediator and arbitrator and a former Justice of the Supreme Court of Queensland in the Trial Division. He was born in Rabaul, Papua New Guinea and was educated at Nudgee College and the University of Queensland, graduating in economics and law.    He became a Queen's Counsel in 1998 and was appointed a Judge of the Supreme Court of Queensland in 2007, where he served until 2018.

References

Judges of the Supreme Court of Queensland
Living people
Australian King's Counsel
1955 births